Sara Lvovna Shor (born Manakhimova, in first marriage Semenduyeva, ; born 12 October 1977 in Derbent, Dagestan, RSFSR, USSR), better known by stage name Jasmin (lit.: jasmine), is a Russian pop singer, actress, model, and TV presenter, designer, of Mountain Jewish descent.

During her musical career she released 10 studio albums. She has been married to Ilan Shor since 2011. In addition to Jasmin's son from a previous marriage, they have a daughter, Margarita, who was born in 2012, and a son, Miron, who was born in 2016.

On 26 October 2022, she was sanctioned by the United States Department of Treasury over her and her husband's association with the government of Russia.

Discography

Albums

Charts

Video albums 
 2005 — "Да!" (solo concert)
 2005 — "Jasmin. Grand Collection" (contains 18 videos)

Bibliography 
 2007 — "Заложница»

Tours 
 2005 — "Да!" (Russia)
 2009 — "Мечта" (USA)
 2012 — "Лабу-Дабу" (USA)
 2012—2014 "От любви до любви" (Russia, Moldova)
 2014—2016  "Другая Я" (Russia, USA, Italy, Spain, Lithuania, Latvia, Estonia)

References

External links
 }
 Жасмин направила открытое письмо послам стран СНГ в Москве 
 Проблемы сирот нашли отклик в шоу-бизнесе 
 «Жасмин без излишеств» Интервью Jewish.ru 
 Блог Жасмин на сайте программы «Здоровье с Еленой Малышевой» 

1977 births
Russian actresses
Russian pop singers
Living people
Russian folk-pop singers
21st-century Russian singers
21st-century Russian women singers
Mountain Jews
Jewish Russian actors
Winners of the Golden Gramophone Award
People from Derbent
Specially Designated Nationals and Blocked Persons List